The Infantry Training Centre (ITC) is a unit of the Sri Lanka Army responsible for both basic and advanced training of Soldiers and Officers joining the infantry. It is based in Minneriya it was established in 1984.

Courses
Young officers course (weapons)
Battalion support weapons course - officers
Battalion support weapon course - other ranks
Senior non commissioned officers tactics course
Non commissioned officers tactics course
Mortar platoon course
Directly enlisted officers course

External links
Infantry Training Centre

Training establishments of the Sri Lanka Army
Sri Lanka